Duncan Dalmao (born December 23, 1978) is a Canadian professional ice hockey coach and former player who is the current head coach of the Indy Fuel of the ECHL. Dalmao played professionally in the North American minor leagues and the English Elite Ice Hockey League (EIHL)

Prior to turning professional, Dalmao played major junior hockey in the Ontario Hockey League. Dalmao turned professional in 1998 with the Jacksonville Lizard Kings. Dalmao played in the ECHL  until 2005, when he moved to England to play for the Basingstoke Bison. Dalmao played two seasons in the EIHL, returned to North America for a season before playing two seasons in Europe to finish his professional career in 2009. Dalmao returned to the amateur ranks, when he joined the Dundas Real McCoys in 2015 for the Allan Cup playoffs.

Awards and honours

Career statistics

References

External links

1978 births
Living people
Basingstoke Bison players
Birmingham Bulls (ECHL) players
Greenville Grrrowl players
Jacksonville Lizard Kings players
London Knights players
London Racers players
Monroe Moccasins players
Norfolk Admirals players
Pee Dee Pride players
Peterborough Petes (ice hockey) players
Roanoke Express players
Ice hockey people from Toronto
Canadian ice hockey defencemen